Dubois is an unincorporated community and census-designated place (CDP) in Dubois County, Indiana, United States. Its population at the 2010 census was 488.

History
Dubois was platted in 1885. It took its name from Dubois County. The Dubois post office was established in 1880.

An old variant name of the community was called Knoxville.

Dennis H. Heeke (1927-2009), Indiana state representative and farmer, was born in Dubois.

Geography
The center of the community is split between Marion and Harbison townships, and the CDP area extends eastward into Columbia Township as well. Indiana State Road 545 passes through Dubois, leading north to State Road 56 and southeast towards Patoka Lake.

The Patoka River, a tributary of the Wabash River, forms the northwestern edge of the community.

Education
The town has a public library, a branch of the Jasper-Dubois County Public Library.

Demographics

References

External links

Census-designated places in Dubois County, Indiana
Census-designated places in Indiana
Populated places established in 1885
1885 establishments in Indiana